CJLI (AM 700 The Light) is a Canadian radio station, that broadcasts a christian format at 700 kHz/AM in Calgary, Alberta. The station is licensed to broadcast at 50,000 watts during the day and 20,000 watts at night, with additional restrictions to protect Class A clear-channel stations WLW in Cincinnati, Ohio and KBYR in Anchorage, Alaska.

Owned by Touch Canada Broadcasting, the station received CRTC approval on April 24, 2009. The station planned to broadcast from a transmitter site from the Black Diamond area southwest of Calgary, but was unable to secure a site, due to local opposition. In November 2013, the station acquired a site north of Black Diamond, in hopes of broadcasting from there.

On June 29, 2015, Touch Canada Broadcasting launched CJLI, branded as AM 700, The Light.

References

External links
AM 700 The Light
CJLI history - Canadian Communications Foundation

Jli
Jli
Radio stations established in 2015
2015 establishments in Alberta